Douwe Bob Posthuma (born 12 December 1992), professionally known by only his first and middle names Douwe Bob, is a Dutch singer-songwriter. He won the Dutch talent show De beste singer-songwriter van Nederland. He specializes in folk and country music and has released four albums. He represented the Netherlands in the Eurovision Song Contest 2016.

Early life
Douwe Bob Posthuma was born on 12 December 1992 in Amsterdam in the Netherlands. He was born into a Frisian family. His father, Simon Posthuma, is known for being a member of The Fool design collective.

Douwe Bob started playing piano at the age of 6, initially concentrating on classical music and jazz. He took up the guitar at age 14. As a singer he was inspired by country, folk and pop music from the 1950s to the mid-1970s.

Career

2012–13: Born in a Storm

In 2012, he competed in the Dutch TV talent show De beste singer-songwriter van Nederland (The Best Singer-Songwriter of the Netherlands). He played the songs "Standing Here Helpless", "Icarus", and in the finale, "Multicoloured Angels". In the finale, he was joined by Dutch singer Tim Knol and the latter's band. He won the finals and "Multicoloured Angels" reached number 17 in the weekly music chart Dutch Top 40. His debut album, Born in a Storm, was released on 3 May 2013. In June 2013, Douwe Bob played at the Pinkpop Festival. At the end of 2013, he appeared in the documentary Whatever Forever: Douwe Bob to talk about his relationship with his father Simon Posthuma, during IDFA.

2014–15: Pass It On

In January 2015, he released the single "Hold Me", produced in collaboration with Anouk. In February 2015, Douwe Bob announced his new album Pass It On. The album was released on 15 May 2015 by record company Universal Music Group.

2016–2017: Eurovision Song Contest and Fool Bar

On 6 May 2016, he released his third studio album Fool Bar by record company Universal Music Group. The album peaked at number four on the Dutch Albums Chart. Douwe Bob represented his country in the Eurovision Song Contest 2016 in Stockholm, where he performed the song "Slow Down" in the semi-finals and finals on 10 and 14 May 2016. He placed eleventh in the final, racking up a total of 153 points. He was the Dutch spokesperson for the Eurovision Song Contest 2017.

2018–present: The Shape I'm In and Singel 39
On 21 April 2017, Douwe Bob was announced as the fourth coach of the seventh season of The Voice Kids, which started on 23 February 2018. In the following season, he did not return and was replaced by Anouk. On 9 November 2018, Douwe Bob released his fourth studio album The Shape I'm In, which he described as being a break-up record. In 2019 he composed the title song for the Dutch feature film Singel 39. He also played a small role in the film. The film won the Golden Film award after having sold 100,000 tickets.

Personal life
On 10 March 2016, in an interview with OutTV, Douwe Bob revealed that he identifies as bisexual. He has two children with two different women, and he and his ex-partner Anouk welcomed a third child in May 2022.

Discography

Albums

Singles

Music videos

Notes

References

External links 

 
 

1992 births
Bisexual men
Bisexual singers
Bisexual songwriters
Dutch country singers
Eurovision Song Contest entrants for the Netherlands
Dutch folk singers
Dutch people of Frisian descent
Dutch singer-songwriters
English-language singers from the Netherlands
Eurovision Song Contest entrants of 2016
Dutch LGBT singers
Dutch LGBT songwriters
Living people
Musicians from Amsterdam
21st-century Dutch male singers
21st-century Dutch singers